The Citroën C-Buggy was a concept car initially presented by Citroën at the 2006 editions of the Madrid Motor Show and the British International Motor Show.

It was a two-seater city car with styling influences from both dune buggy and sport utility vehicle. It was made with some protection against off road grievances, such as having a slightly raised suspension and also including sump guards. It had tinted glass inserts in the lower body side panels and no doors.

References

External links

C-Buggy